Proxima Centauri may refer to:

 Proxima Centauri (Alpha Centauri C / Rigel Kentarus C), the nearest star to the Sun
 Proxima Centauri (album), by Norwegian black metal band Ancient in 2001
 Proxima Centauri (song), off the eponymous 2001 album by Norwegian black metal band Ancient
 Proxima Centauri (short story), 1936 science-fiction story by Murray Leinster

See also
 Proxima (disambiguation)
 Centauri (disambiguation)